Jason Beckfield is an American academic. He is a professor of Sociology at Harvard University.

Early life
Jason Beckfield grew up in Joplin, Missouri and graduated from Truman State University. He earned a PhD from Indiana University Bloomington.

Career
Beckfield was an assistant professor of Sociology at the University of Chicago from 2004 to 2007. He joined Harvard University as assistant professor in 2007, and became a tenured professor in 2011. He later served as the department chair. Additionally, he is an affiliate scholar of the Stanford Center on Poverty & Inequality at Stanford University.

His research focuses on social inequality, especially in the European Union. He has also written about world polity theory.

Personal life
Beckfield has two children.

References

Living people
People from Joplin, Missouri
Truman State University alumni
Indiana University Bloomington alumni
University of Chicago faculty
Harvard University faculty
American sociologists
Year of birth missing (living people)